Nuclear energy by country may refer to:

 Nuclear energy policy by country
 Nuclear power by country